Kate Jennings Grant (born March 23, 1970) is an American actress. She has appeared in a number of Broadway productions during her career, including Proof, An American Daughter, and Guys and Dolls. She also has appeared in films such as United 93 (2006) and Frost/Nixon (2008).

Life and career
Katherine Grant was born on March 23, 1970 in Elizabeth, New Jersey. She attended the Juilliard School and the University of Pennsylvania. Shortly after graduating from Juilliard, she appeared in the 1996 US tour of the musical Applause, as "Eve", with Stefanie Powers. She appeared Off-Broadway in Wonderland in 1999, Hard Feelings in 2000, Summer of '42 in 2001, Radiant Baby in 2003, The Beard of Avon in 2003, Between Us in 2004, and The Marriage of Bette and Boo by Christopher Durang in 2008.

Grant appeared on Broadway in An American Daughter as "Quincy Quince", and in Proof as "Claire", from July 2, 2002 - January 5, 2003, both as replacements. She appeared in Guys and Dolls in 2009 as "Sarah Brown", The Lyons in 2012, The Country House in 2014, and Noises Off officially opening in January 2016.

On television, Grant has guest starred on Sex and the City, Law & Order, Law & Order: Criminal Intent, Law & Order: Special Victims Unit, Damages, Supernatural and many other shows. She had the recurring roles in the ABC political drama Commander in Chief and Amazon political satire Alpha House. In film, she made her debut in the 1998 romantic comedy The Object of My Affection starring Jennifer Aniston, and the following years had supporting parts in films include Kinsey and When a Stranger Calls. She played Lauren Catuzzi Grandcolas in the 2006 biographical drama United 93, and appeared as Diane Sawyer in the 2008  historical drama Frost/Nixon. She also appeared in The Rebound (2009), Love & Other Drugs (2010), and Custody (2016).

In 2016, Grant was cast in her first series regular role on the ABC drama series Notorious playing Louise Herrick, the host of a news program at the center of the series.

Filmography

Film

Television

References

External links

 

1970 births
20th-century American actresses
21st-century American actresses
Living people
Actors from Elizabeth, New Jersey
University of Pennsylvania alumni
Juilliard School alumni
Actresses from New Jersey